Fray Matías Abad (died 1649) was a Franciscan priest who was martyred in the New World. He was born in the Spanish town of Cueto, in the province of Santander, and died in Uraba on the Atlantic coast of Colombia in January 1649. He was the founder of Franciscan missions in the province of Chocó, Colombia.

The son of Toribio Abad and Catalina de Higuera, Matías left his native Spain to travel to New Granada at an unknown date. He worked in the silver mines of Santa Ana at Mariquita (in modern Colombia) before entering the Franciscan order. Little is known of his activities prior to 1648; in that year, Fray Matías was in Cartagena at the Convent of Loreto, one of the more important centres for the order in New Granada. He was on friendly terms with the governor Pedro Zapata, who supported his desire to conduct missionary work among the indigenous population of the Chocó region. Aided by Zapata, Fray Matías went to Antioquia in July 1648, finally reaching Chocó the following month in the company of another priest Miguel Romero. Matías related the details of his trip in three separate letters.

The encounter with the Choco Indians went off successfully. As told in a fragmentary diary of January 1649, Fray Matías travelled down the Atrato river in the company of 23 Indians, looking for the mouth of the river on the Urabá coast. On the 30th of January, they were attacked by a group of Uraba Indians, mortal enemies of the Choco Indians. Both Fray Matías and Fray Miguel lost their lives. The body of Fray Matías was taken to Cartagena, along with his lance; there he was venerated at the Convent of San Francisco for the following two centuries.

References

Spanish Roman Catholic priests
1649 deaths
Spanish Franciscans
People from Santander, Spain